This is a list of the members of the 1928 Seanad Éireann, the upper house of the Oireachtas (legislature) of the Irish Free State. These Senators were elected or appointed in 1922 and elected at the 1925 and 1928 Seanad elections.

Composition of the 1928 Seanad
The Free State Seanad was elected in stages and thus considered to be in permanent session. However, as a gesture of continuity with its Free State predecessor, the first Seanad elected after 1937 is numbered as the "Second Seanad". The Free State Senate, despite the occurrence of five senatorial elections before its abolition, is considered to have been a single 'Seanad' for the duration of its existence and is thus referred for that whole period as the "First Seanad".

There were a total of 60 seats in the Free State Seanad. In 1928, 17 Senators were elected. The previous Seanad election in 1925 was a popular election. However, at the 1928 and subsequent Free State Seanad elections, the franchise was restricted to Oireachtas members.

19 Senators had been elected at the 1925 Seanad election. In 1922, 30 Senators had been elected by Dáil Éireann, and 30 had been nominated by the President of the Executive Council, W. T. Cosgrave.

The following table shows the composition by party when the 1928 Seanad first met on 12 December 1928.

List of senators

Changes

See also
Members of the 6th Dáil
Government of the 6th Dáil

References

External links

 
 1928